Fortunato Depero (30 March 1892 – 29 November 1960) was an Italian futurist painter, writer, sculptor, and graphic designer.

Biography 
Although born in Fondo or in the neighboring village of Malosco, according to other sources (in the Italian Trentino region, at that time the County of Tyrol in the Austrian-Hungarian empire), Depero grew up in Rovereto and it was here he first began exhibiting his works, while serving as an apprentice to a marble worker. It was on a 1913 trip to Florence that he discovered a copy of the paper Lacerba and an article by one of the founders of the futurism movement, Filippo Tommaso Marinetti. Depero was inspired, and in 1914 moved to Rome and met fellow futurist Giacomo Balla. It was with Balla in 1915 that he wrote the manifesto Ricostruzione futurista dell’universo ("Futurist Reconstruction of the Universe") which expanded upon the ideas introduced by the other futurists. It sought the abstract equivalent for all forms and elements of the universe. The goal was to make the universe "more joyful" through an integral recreation.  In the same year he was designing stage sets and costumes for a ballet.

In 1919 Depero founded the House of Futurist Art in Rovereto, which specialised in producing toys, tapestries and furniture in the futurist style. In 1925 he represented the futurists at the Exposition Internationale des Arts Décoratifs et Industriels Modernes (International Exposition of Modern Industrial and Decorative Arts), and presented a Futurist Hall at the Monza Biennial. In 1927, together with his friend, advertising agent and publisher Fedele Azari (Dinamo-Azari), Fortunato Depero designed Depero futurista 1913–1927 – the so-called "bolted book" – which was printed in letterpress with his direct supervision and involvement by the Mercurio print works of Rovereto. Depero futurista 1913–1927 was a commercial book to be sold, to promote and document the work of Depero, and to legitimise him as an artist. It was a showcase portfolio relating to a specific period (1913–1927), but also an atypical and pioneering artwork in the form of a book, an ideological declaration. It is a work that celebrates Depero the artist, graphic designer and artisan, a blend described as ‘total fusion’ by Giacomo Balla and Depero in their manifesto of 1915 Ricostruzione futurista dell’universo.

1928 saw Depero move to New York City. From this year to 1930, his works were not successful. The city was still reeling from the effects of the Wall Street crash so his paintings did not sell while the Futurist House, his first commercial enterprise there closed after barely two months of operations. He experienced a degree of success later on, doing costumes for stage productions and designing covers for magazines including MovieMaker, The New Yorker and Vogue, among others. He also dabbled in interior design during his stay, working on two restaurants which were later demolished to make way for the Rockefeller Center. He also did work for the New York Daily News and Macy's, and built a house on 23rd Street. In 1930 he returned to Italy.

In the 1930s and 40s Depero continued working, although due to futurism being linked with fascism, the movement started to wane. The artistic development of the movement in this period can mostly be attributed to him and Balla. One of the projects he was involved in during this time was Dinamo magazine, which he founded and edited. After the end of the Second World War, Depero had trouble with authorities in Europe and in 1947 decided to try New York again. This time he found the reception not quite as welcoming. One of his achievements on his second stay in the United States was the publication of So I Think, So I Paint, a translation of his autobiography initially released in 1940: Fortunato Depero nelle opere e nella vita (literally, Fortunato Depero, his works and his life). From the winter of 1947 to late October 1949 Depero lived in a cottage in New Milford, Connecticut, relaxing and continuing with his long-standing plans to open a museum. His host was William Hillman, an associate of the then-President, Harry S. Truman.

After New Milford, Depero returned to Rovereto, where he would live out his days. In August 1959 Galleria Museo Depero opened, fulfilling one of his long-term ambitions. On 29 November 1960, after being ill with diabetes and spending the last two years unable to paint due to hemiparesis, Depero died aged 68.

Works 
Many of his works are featured in the permanent collection of the Museum of Modern and Contemporary Art of Trento and Rovereto (MART). The Casa d'Arte Futurista Depero, Italy's only museum dedicated to the Futurist movement, containing 3,000 objects, is now one of MART's venues. Closed for many years for extensive refurbishment, the Casa d'Arte Futurista Depero reopened in 2009. A number of important artists, thinkers, and architects worked on the Casa with Depero―especially those who were from the region―including Fausto Melotti, Gino Pollini, and Carlo Belli.

Depero's designs and artworks completed for advertising were mainly monochromatic or utilized a spot color to emphasize text. His full-color designs followed Futurist color schemes featuring red, brown, ocher and the occasional accents of bright blue or aqua.

Exhibitions
From 22 February to 28 June 2014, the Center for Italian Modern Art exhibited Depero's work which engaged in dialogues with Dada and Metaphysical Painting, Espirit Nouveau, and Art Deco.

Writings
 So I think, so I paint: Ideologies of an Italian self-made painter, Mutilati e Invalidi, Trento, 1947 ASIN: B0007JG8YG

References

 Belli, G., Depero futurista: Rome-Paris-New York: 1915–1932, exhibithion catalogue, The Wolfsonian Florida International University, Miami Beach, Florida. Milan: Skira, 1999.
 Camillini, G., Fortunato Depero and Depero futurista 1913-1927, Soveria Mannelli: Rubbettino editore, 2021.
 Chiesa, L., “Transnational Multimedia: Fortunato Depero’s Impressions of New York City (1928–1930),” California Italian Studies, 1, 2010.
 Ewing, H., ed., Fortunato Depero, exhibition catalogue, Center for Italian Modern Art, New York, 2014.
 Greene, V., ed., Italian Futurism 1909–1944: Reconstructing the Universe, exhibition catalogue, Guggenheim Museum, New York, 2014.
Troy, Virginia Gardner, "Stitching Modernity: The Textile Work of Fortunato Depero," Journal of Modern Italian Studies, Vol. 20, No. 1, January 2015, p. 24–33.

External links

Fortunato Depero at Designboom
Depero Bio at Guggenheim 
Depero exhibition at the Center for Italian Modern Art, 2014
Los pabellones publicitarios de Fortunato Depero, 2020

Literature 
 Steven Heller, Georgette Ballance. Graphic Design History. 2001 (p. 153-160)

Italian designers
Italian Futurist painters
Futurist sculptors
1892 births
1960 deaths
Italian graphic designers
Italian magazine editors
Futurist writers
People from Trentino
20th-century Italian painters
20th-century Italian sculptors
20th-century Italian male artists